E261 can refer to:
European route E261, a European route
Potassium acetate, a chemical compound